Artur Mikhaylovich Maloyan (born on 4 February 1989) is a professional Russian footballer of Armenian ethnic origin.

Career

Spartak Moscow
He made his debut for the main Spartak squad in the Russian Premier League game against Luch-Energiya Vladivostok on 16 November 2008.

Anzhi
Maloyan played in the Russian First Division season 2009 for Anzhi Makhachkala on loan from Spartak Moscow.

Tyumen
He joined FC Tyumen on loan for the 2018–19 season. In November 2018 his loan contract was terminated, and he returned to Yenisey Krasnoyarsk, but was not allowed to train with the main squad there either.

Urozhay
On 31 January 2019, he signed a 2.5-year contract with FC Urozhay Krasnodar.

National team

Russia U-21
He made his debut for Russia national under-21 football team against Andorra U-21 on April 1, 2009.

References

External links
Profile at championat.ru

1989 births
Living people
Sportspeople from Krasnodar
Russian sportspeople of Armenian descent
Russian footballers
Association football midfielders
Russia under-21 international footballers
FC Spartak Moscow players
Russian Premier League players
FC Anzhi Makhachkala players
FC Ural Yekaterinburg players
FC Shinnik Yaroslavl players
FC Arsenal Tula players
FC Mordovia Saransk players
FC Yenisey Krasnoyarsk players
FC Tyumen players
FC Urozhay Krasnodar players
FC Dynamo Bryansk players